Iklim is a Malaysian rock band that became famous in Malaysia, Indonesia, Singapore, Brunei, southern Thailand, and the Cocos Islands in Australia during the 90s. Iklim was officially formed in 1990 and sang Malay songs of the Rock and Slow Rock genres. Iklim became the whistle of the time because it was popular with the song "Suci Dalam Debu". Until now, Iklim songs have always played on the radio.

The hit song is Suci Dalam Debu, Bukan Aku Tak Cinta, Mimpi Yang Pulang, Hakikat Sebuah Cinta and Seribu Kali Sayang. The album Suci Dalam Debu sold 1,000,000 units in Indonesia, and raised the name of Iklim as a well -known and successful group in the neighboring country to date.

History 
Iklim was founded in Terengganu and began when singers AM Salim Abdul Majeed, or Saleem-Iklim, in 1988, appointed a number of friends and young villagers to establish a singing group. In early 1989, before creating the name, Iklim often performed at clubs and ceremonies around the state.

In 1990, SCS Record made Iklim's first album recording. The debut single, "Suci Dalam Debu", became a hit. Other singles, such as "Hakikat Sebuah Cinta", "Satu Kesan Abadi", "Sandiwara Cinta Semusim Ammarah Bujang Kota" and "Seribu Penghargaan", were popular in Malaysia and Indonesia during the early 1990s.

Members 
Originally, the Iklim group comprised five young people: AM Saleem Abdul Majid, Umarul Mahdzar, Mohd Salim, Suhaimi Kamaruddin and Fadhil. However, fragmentation occurred when a second guitarist, Fadhil Suhaimi, left the band during the process of recording the first album. He was replaced by Huzali Ali as the instrument board tone player on the first album. In 1995, Saleem Abdul Majid left Iklim.

1988–1990
 A.M Saleem Abdul Majid (Saleem) – vocalist
 Umarul – electric & acoustic guitar
 Mohd Salim (Mohalim) – bass guitar
 Fadhil Suhaimi (Fadhil) – the guitarist
 Kamaruddin (Kama) – drums

1990–1994
 A.M Abdul Majid Saleem (Saleem) – vocalist
 Umarul Mahdzar (Umarul) – electric & acoustic guitar
 Mohd Salim (Mohalim) – bass guitar
 Kamaruddin (Kama) – drums
 Huzali Ali (Huzali) – board tone

1994–1996
 Saleem – vocals
 Mohalim – bass guitar
 Kama – drum
 Huzali – board tone

1996–1997
 Mohalim – bass guitar
 Kama – drum
 Huzali – board tone
 Azmani – guest vocalist

1997 (special combined Dirgahayu album)
 Saleem – vocalist
 Mohalim – bass guitar
 Kama – drum
 Huzali – board tone

1998–1999
 Mohalim – bass guitar
 Kama – drum
 Huzali – board tone
 Khir – vocals
 Ghani – guitar

2003–2004 (Reunion Iklim)
 Saleem – vocals
 Umarul – main guitar
 Mohalim – bass guitar
 Kama – drum
 Huzali – board tone

2007 – Iklim & Frenz – Nuance '07
 Umarul – main guitar
 Mohalim – bass guitar
 Kama – drum
 Huzali – board tone
 Ghani – second guitar
 Guest Vocalists –
 Faizal (AF)
 Aris Ariwatan
 J. Yanzent
 Mus (May)
 Joey (BPR)

2007–2020
 Umarul – guitar
 Mohalim – bass
 Kama – drums
 Huzali – board tone

2020–Present
 Azmani – vocal
 Umarul – guitar
 Mohalim – bass
 Kama – drums
 Huzali – board tone

Discography 
Studio albums
 Satu Kesan Abadi (1990)
 Bulan Jatuh Ke Riba (1991)
 Budi (1992)
 Iklim (1994)
 Bukan Niatku(1995)
 Salam Perpisahan (1996)
 Pergimu Satu Tanda (1998)
 Bunga Emas (2003)

With Frenz
 Nuansa (2007)

Single
 Mawar Kasturi (2020)

Collection albums
 Dunia Iklim (1993)
 Saleem (Iklim)(1993)
 Seribu Penghargaan (1995)
 Sambutlah Tanganku (1997)
 Emas Selamanya (1997)
 Dirgahayu (1997)

Compilation albums
 Iklim & Saleem (MTV Karaoke Version) (1998)
 Saleem IKLIM & Rahmat EKAMATRA (2000)
 Best Of The Best IKLIM & SEARCH (2002)
 Iklim EMAS UNPLUGGED (2003)
 Iklim EMAS MYSTERPICE (2003)
 Iklim EMAS MODERATE (2003)
 Iklim Sesuatu Yang Abadi (2003)
 Iklim Musim Bermusim (2004)
 Iklim Memori Hit (2005)
 Iklim (KEUNGGULAN Saleem & Iklim) (2007)
 Iklim (Nyanyian Syahdu / Saleem & Iklim Terunggul) ( 2007)

Awards 

Anugerah Juara Lagu (1990) - Suci Dalam Debu (Best Lyrics)
Anugerah Cakera Platinum Berkembar Tiga (1991)
Anugerah Industri Muzik Pertama - Album - Dunia Iklim Collection (1993)
Anugerah Industri Muzik Pertama - Album - Dunia Iklim - Best Vocal Group In Album (1993)

References

External links 
Iklim at Muzikrock.com
Saleem Iklim on Facebook

Malaysian hard rock musical groups
Malaysian pop rock music groups
Musical groups established in 1989
1989 establishments in Malaysia